Ruled is the fifth full-length LP by The Giraffes.  Drums, bass and principal guitar tracks recorded at The Bunker in Brooklyn, NY.  Vocals and additional guitars recorded at Strangeweather in Brooklyn, NY.  Mixed at Studio G in Brooklyn, NY by Joel Hamilton.  Mastered by Julian Silva at On Air Mastering.  Produced by The Giraffes and Joel Hamilton.

Track listing

All songs written by The Giraffes.

"The Border" - 3:10 	
"The Bed" - 5:58  	
"The City" - 6:47
"The Kids" - 3:35
"The Invasion" - 2:23
"The Store" - 6:32
"The War of Hormones" - 7:59
"The Occupation" - 13:24

Personnel
 Aaron Lazar - vocals
 Damien Paris - guitar
 Jens Carstensen - bass
 Andrew Totolos - drums
 James SK Wān – bamboo flute
 Joel Hamilton - engineer, mixer  
 Marc Alan Goodman - engineer
 Titfinger - art direction

References

External links
 The Giraffes // Ruled at Crustacean Records

2011 albums
The Giraffes (Brooklyn band) albums